The 1981 World Sportscar Championship season was the 29th season of FIA World Sportscar Championship motor racing. It featured the 1981 FIA World Endurance Championship which was contested over a fifteen race series which ran from 31 January to 27 September. The former World Challenge for Endurance Drivers was renamed to the World Endurance Championship of Drivers for 1981 and the World Championship of Makes was renamed to the World Endurance Championship of Makes. Bob Garretson won the World Endurance Championship of Drivers and Lancia was awarded the World Endurance Championship of Makes.

Schedule

World Endurance Championship of Drivers was contested over all fifteen races however only six of the races counted towards the World Endurance Championship of Makes.

Season results
Although various classes of cars contested the championship races, only the overall race winners are listed in the table below.

 The 24 Hours of Daytona, the 12 Hours of Sebring, the Los Angeles Times Grand Prix and the Road America 500 were also rounds of the 1981 IMSA GT Championship.
 The 6 Hours of Daytona was restricted to Racing Stock class cars  (i.e. IMSA RS).
 The 24 Hours of Spa was restricted to Belgian Touring Cars  (i.e. Group 1).

World Endurance Championship of Drivers
The World Endurance Championship of Drivers was open to FIA Group 1, Group 2, Group 3, Group 4, Group 5, Group 6, Group C and GTP cars and to IMSA GTX, IMSA GTP, IMSA AAGT, IMSA GTO, IMSA GTU and IMSA RS cars.

Drivers Championship points were awarded on a 20-19-18-17-16-15-14-13-12-11-10-9-8-7-6-5-4-3-2-1 basis to the first twenty overall finishers at each round.
Bonus points were also awarded as follows:
 0 points for Category 1 (Group 6 over 2 litres)
 1 point  for Category 2 (Group 5 over 2 litres, GTP over 2 litres, Group C over 2 litres, IMSA GTX over 2 litres, IMSA GTP over 2 litres, IMSA AAGT)
 2 points for Category 3 (Group 6 under 2 litres, Group 5 under 2 litres, Group 4 under 2 litres, IMSA GTO, IMSA GTX under 2 litres)
 3 points for Category 4 (GTP under 2 litres, Group 2 over 2 litres, IMSA GTU, Group C under 2 litres)
 4 points for Category 5 (Group 4 under 2 litres, Group 1 over 2 litres)
 5 points for Category 6 (Group 2 under 2 litres, Group 1 under 2 litres, IMSA RS)

Only half points were awarded at the shortened Nurbugring round. All points scored were retained towards the championship totals.

Results

A total of 371 drivers scored points in the 1981 World Endurance Championship of Drivers.

World Endurance Championship of Makes
The World Endurance Championship of Makes was open FIA Group 1, Group 2, Group 3, Group 4 and Group 5 cars and to IMSA GTX cars.

Cars from all eligible groups were combined, and then divided into two Divisions based on engine capacity.
Points were awarded on a 20-15-12-10-8-6-4-3-2-1 basis for the top ten places in each Division at each race.
Only the best placed car of each make in each division at each race was eligible to score points.
Cars from groups not included in the championship (e.g. FIA Group 6 cars) were disregarded when assessing divisional positions for championship purposes.
Only half points were awarded for the shortened Nurburgring race.
The best five round results could be retained by each make.

Results
The overall World Endurance Championship of Makes title was won by Lancia. Although both Lancia and Porsche scored 100 points from their best five class results, Lancia was awarded the title based on its six divisional victories against the five scored by Porsche .

Over 2000 cc

Under 2000 cc

References

Further reading

External links
 1981 World Endurance Championship Race Results
 Racing Sports Cars

World Sportscar Championship seasons
World Sportscar Championship